War communism or military communism (Vojenný kommunizm) was the economic and political system that existed in Soviet Russia during the Russian Civil War from 1918 to 1921.

According to Soviet historiography, the ruling Bolshevik administration adopted this policy with the goal of keeping towns (the proletarian power-base) and the Red Army stocked with food and weapons since circumstances dictated new economic measures. During the civil war, the old capitalist market-based system was unable to produce food and expand the industrial base. War communism has often been described as simple authoritarian control by the ruling and military castes to maintain power and control in the Soviet regions, rather than any coherent political ideology.

War communism began in June 1918, enforced by the Supreme Economic Council, known as the Vesenkha. It ended on 21 March 1921 with the beginning of the New Economic Policy, which lasted until 1928.

Policies 

War communism included the following policies:
 Nationalization of all industries and the introduction of strict centralized management
 State control of foreign trade
 Strict discipline for workers, with strikes forbidden
 Obligatory labor duty by non-working classes ("militarization of labor", including an early version of the Gulag)
 Prodrazvyorstka – requisition of agricultural surplus (in excess of an absolute minimum) from peasants for centralized distribution among the remaining population
 Rationing of food and most commodities, with centralized distribution in urban centers
 Private enterprise banned
 Military-style control of the railways

Because the Bolshevik government implemented all these measures in a time of civil war, they were far less coherent and coordinated in practice than they might appear on paper. Large areas of Russia remained outside Bolshevik control, and poor communications meant that even those regions loyal to the Bolshevik government often had to act on their own, lacking orders or coordination from Moscow. It has long been debated whether "war communism" represented an actual economic policy in the proper sense of the phrase, or merely a set of measures intended to win the civil war.

Aims 
The goals of the Bolsheviks in implementing war communism are a matter of controversy. Some commentators, including a number of Bolsheviks, have argued that its sole purpose was to win the war. Vladimir Lenin, for instance, said that "the confiscation of surpluses from the peasants was a measure with which we were saddled by the imperative conditions of war-time." Other Bolsheviks, such as Yurii Larin, Lev Kritzman, Leonid Krasin, and Nikolai Bukharin, argued that it was a transitional step towards socialism. Commentators, such as the historian Richard Pipes, the philosopher Michael Polanyi, and economists such as Paul Craig Roberts or Sheldon L. Richman, have argued that war communism was actually an attempt to immediately eliminate private property, commodity production and market exchange, and in that way to implement communist economics, and that the Bolshevik leaders expected an immediate and large-scale increase in economic output. This view was also held by Bukharin, who said that "We conceived War Communism as the universal, so to say 'normal' form of the economic policy of the victorious proletariat and not as being related to the war, that is, conforming to a definite state of the civil war".

Results

Military 
War communism was largely successful at its primary purpose of aiding the Red Army in halting the advance of the White Army and in reclaiming most of the territory of the former Russian Empire thereafter.

Social 

In the cities and surrounding countryside, the population experienced hardships as a result of the war. Peasants, because of the extreme scarcity, were beginning to refuse to co-operate in giving food for the war effort. Workers began migrating from the cities to the countryside, where the chances to feed themselves were higher, thus further decreasing the possibility of barter of industrial goods for food and worsening the plight of the remaining urban population, economy and industrial production. Between 1918 and 1920, Petrograd lost 70% of its population, while Moscow lost over 50%.

A series of workers' strikes and peasants' rebellions broke out all over the country, such as the Tambov rebellion (1920–1921). A turning point came with the Kronstadt rebellion at the Kronstadt naval base in early March 1921. The rebellion startled Lenin because Bolsheviks considered Kronstadt sailors the "reddest of the reds".  The nature of these uprisings and their leadership were also of significant concern because they were generally left-wing uprisings led by oppositionist leftists, thus creating competition with the Bolsheviks. According to David Christian, the Cheka, the state Communist Party secret police, reported 118 peasant uprisings in February 1921.

David Christian, in his book Imperial and Soviet Russia, summarises the state of Russia in 1921 after years of War communism: A government claiming to represent the people now found itself on the verge of being overthrown by that same working class. The crisis had undermined the loyalty of the villages, the towns and finally sections of the army. It was fully as serious as the crises faced by the tsarist government in 1905 and February 1917.

Bolshevik officials were paralyzed by the Russian famine of 1921–22 which coincided with the catastrophic crisis of the war and economic difficulties faced by the new regime. These militarization efforts were taken to sustain the Red Army for the war effort and the defence of the new state, for proper logistics, and to distribute the scarce supplies to people that the regime considered needed it more than others, such as the Red Army.

Economic 
A black market emerged in Russia, despite the threat of martial law against profiteering. The ruble collapsed and barter increasingly replaced money as a medium of exchange and, by 1921, heavy industry output had fallen to 20% of 1913 levels. 90% of wages were paid with goods rather than money. 70% of locomotives were in need of repair, and food requisitioning, combined with the effects of seven years of war and a severe drought, contributed to a famine that caused between 3 and 10 million deaths. Coal production decreased from 27.5 million tons (1913) to 7 million tons (1920), while overall factory production also declined from 10,000 million roubles to 1,000 million roubles. According to the noted historian David Christian, the grain harvest was also slashed from 80.1 million tons (1913) to 46.5 million tons (1920).

See also 
 Barracks communism
 Council of Labor and Defense
 Family in the Soviet Union
 Kronstadt rebellion

Footnotes

Further reading 
 Ball, Alan M. Russia's Last Capitalists: The Nepmen, 1921-1929 (U of California Press, 1990) online free pp 10–38.
 
 Markevich, Andrei, and Mark Harrison. "Great War, Civil War, and recovery: Russia's national income, 1913 to 1928." Journal of Economic History 71.3 (2011): 672–703. online
 Malle, Silvana.  The Economic Organization of War Communism 1918—1921 (Cambridge University Press, 2002. — 568 p.)  .
 Roberts, Paul C. "'War Communism': A Re-examination," Slavic Review 29 (June 1970): 238–261

1918 establishments in Russia
1921 disestablishments in Russia
1910s economic history
1920s economic history
Russian Civil War
Soviet phraseology
Economic history of the Soviet Union